The 1979 Wirral Metropolitan Borough Council election took place on 3 May 1979 to elect members of Wirral Metropolitan Borough Council in England. This election was held on the same day as other local elections.

After the election, the composition of the council was:

Election results

Overall election result

Overall result compared with 1978.

Ward results

Birkenhead

No. 1 (Argyle-Clifton-Holt)

No. 2 (Bebington and Mersey)

No. 3 (Cathcart-Claughton-Cleveland)

No. 4 (Devonshire and Egerton)

No. 5 (Gilbrook and St James)

No. 6 (Grange and Oxton)

No. 7 (Prenton)

No. 8 (Upton)

Wallasey

No. 9 (Leasowe)

No. 10 (Marlowe-Egremont-South Liscard)

No. 11 (Moreton and Saughall Massie)

No. 12 (New Brighton-Wallasey-Warren)

No. 13 (North Liscard-Upper Brighton Street)

No. 14 (Seacombe-Poulton-Somerville)

Bebington

No. 15 (Higher Bebington and Woodhey)

No. 16 (Park-New Ferry-North Bromborough)

No. 17 (South Bromborough and Eastham)

No. 18 (Lower Bebington and Poulton)

Hoylake

No. 19 (Caldy and Frankby)

No. 20 (Central-Hoose-Meols-Park)

Wirral

No. 21 (Barnston-Gayton-Heswall-Oldfield)

No. 22 (Irby-Pensby-Thurstaston)

Notes

• italics denote the sitting councillor • bold denotes the winning candidate

References

1979 English local elections
1979
1970s in Merseyside